Giacomo da Lentini, also known as Jacopo da Lentini or with the appellative Il Notaro, was an Italian poet of the 13th century. He was a senior poet of the Sicilian School and was a notary at the court of the Holy Roman Emperor Frederick II. Giacomo is credited with the invention of the sonnet. His poetry was originally written in literary Sicilian, though it only survives in Tuscan.

Although some scholars believe that da Lentini's Italian poetry about courtly love was an adaptation of the Provençal poetry of the troubadours, William Baer argues that the first eight lines of the earliest Sicilian sonnets, rhymed ABABABAB, are identical to the eight-line Sicilian folksong stanza known as the Strambotto. Therefore, da Lentini, or whoever else invented the form, added two tercets to the Strambotto in order to create the 14-line Sicilian sonnet.

As with other poets of the time, he corresponded often with fellow poets, circulating poems in manuscript and commenting on others; one of his main correspondents was Pier della Vigna. Some of his sonnets were produced in tenzone, a collaborative form of poetry writing in which one poet would write a sonnet and another would respond, likewise in a sonnet; da Lentini cooperated in this manner with the Abbot of Tivoli.

A "Canzone" of Giacomo da Lentini 
This is one of the most popular poems - "Canzone" (Song) - of Giacomo da Lentini. The Italian text is from "I poeti della Scuola siciliana. Vol. 1: Giacomo da Lentini", Milano, Mondadori, 2008, 47–49.

In popular culture
 In Canto 24 of The Purgatorio, Virgil and  Dante Alighieri encounter the soul of Giacomo da Lentini.
 Dante Gabriel Rossetti's volume The Early Italian Poets contains his literary translations of the poetry of Giocomo da Lentini, Emperor Frederick, and many other poets of the Sicilian School.
 In Jorge Luis Borges' sonnet Un Poeta del Siglo XIII ("A Poet of the 13th Century"), the unnamed protagonist is Giacomo da Lentini.

References

External links
 

Italian male poets
Sicilian School poets
Sonneteers
Sonnet studies
13th-century inventors